This list of the tallest statues in the United States ranks free-standing statues based on their height from base to top. The list also includes novelty architecture.

Statues over 12.2 m (40 ft)

Statues between 6.1 and 12.2 m (20 and 40 ft)

Statues under 6.1 m (20 ft)

Other organizational lists

 List of tallest statues
 List of statues
 List of Roman domes
 New Seven Wonders of the World
 List of archaeological sites sorted by country
 List of colossal sculpture in situ
 List of megalithic sites
 List of archaeoastronomical sites sorted by country
 List of Egyptian pyramids
 List of Mesoamerican pyramids

References

Statues, tallest
Statues, tallest
United States, tallest
 Tallest statues
Statues, United States